Bharatkumar "Bharat" Patel (born 16 April 1952) is a Zimbabwean judge who has served on the Supreme Court of Zimbabwe since 2013.

Education 
Patel was born on 16 April 1952 in Salisbury, Southern Rhodesia (today Harare, Zimbabwe). He attended Louis Mountbatten School, a government school in Salisbury. He received his secondary education at two private schools, Peterhouse Boys' School and St. George's College. He completed his legal training at the University of Rhodesia in 1975 and subsequently departed for England, where he qualified as a barrister at Inner Temple and obtained his master's degree in law from University College London.

Career background
Patel began his career in 1978 in the London para-legal sector, with the Greater London Citizens Advice Bureaux Service, focusing on civil rights, employment and social welfare law. In 1982 he returned to Zimbabwe and joined government service as legal counsel performing advisory and representative duties in matters of public law and international law. From 1993 he headed the Division of Legal Advice in the Attorney-General's Office of Zimbabwe until he was appointed to the position of Deputy Attorney General of Zimbabwe in August 2000. In April 2003 he assumed the post of Acting Attorney-General after the resignation of Andrew Chigovera.

In December 2004 Patel was appointed to the bench in the High Court of Zimbabwe, and assumed judicial duties in January 2005. From December 2007 to December 2008 he was temporarily re-appointed to the post of Acting Attorney-General, following the suspension and removal from office of the previous incumbent, Sobuza Gula-Ndebele.

In May 2013 Patel was appointed to the Supreme Court of Zimbabwe as Judge of Appeal. He was simultaneously appointed to the Constitutional Court of Zimbabwe by virtue of certain transitional provisions in the new Constitution of Zimbabwe which came into operation in May 2013. He was sworn in, alongside fellow Justice Ben Hlatshwayo, by President Robert Mugabe at State House in Harare on 22 May 2013.

References

1952 births
Living people
Alumni of Peterhouse Boys' School
Zimbabwean Hindus
20th-century Zimbabwean lawyers
Attorneys-General of Zimbabwe
Zimbabwean people of Indian descent
Judges of the Supreme Court of Zimbabwe
University of Zimbabwe alumni
Alumni of University College London
Alumni of St. George's College, Harare
Zimbabwean expatriates in England
21st-century Zimbabwean judges